The United Nationalist Democratic Organization (UNIDO) was the main political multi-party electoral alliance of the traditional political opposition during the turbulent last years of Philippine President Ferdinand Marcos in the mid-1980s. It was formed in January 1980, and was originally known as the United Democratic Opposition from 1980 to 1982. It was initially a union of eight major and minor political parties and organizations with the main aim to oust President Marcos through a legal political process. In April 1982, the coalition received its present name, and increased its members to twelve parties. Shortly after the assassination of popular opposition senator Benigno Aquino Jr., the party was led by Senator Salvador Laurel of Batangas.

History
The political leaders forming UNIDO such as prominent anti-Marcos leaders like former Senator and Batangas Assemblyman Salvador Laurel, former president Diosdado Macapagal, Zamboanga City Mayor Cesar Climaco, Senator Gerardo Roxas, Manila Assemblyman Lito Atienza, Antique Governor Evelio Javier, Mandaluyong Assemblyman Neptali Gonzales, Pampanga Governor Jose B. Lingad, Senator John Osmeña, Senator Dominador Aytona, Senator and renowned nationalist statesman Lorenzo Tañada, Senator Eva Estrada-Kalaw, Senator Rene Espina, Senator Mamintal Tamano, Senator Domocao Alonto and nephew Abul Kharyl, Assemblyman Raul Gonzales, Assemblyman Homobono Adaza, former Philippine Collegian editor-in-chief and leftist-bent journalist Abe Sarmiento, and all significant personalities that contributed to the fall of the Marcos dictatorship.

The political groups allied with UNIDO were the Partido Demokratiko Pilipino–Lakas ng Bayan (PDP–Laban) represented by Senator Aquilino Pimentel, Jr., Bansang Nagkakaisa sa Diwa at Layunin (BANDILA) led by Agapito Aquino, the younger brother of Ninoy Aquino and one of the founders of the August Twenty-One Movement (ATOM).

UNIDO gained momentum in the last week of November 1985, when President Ferdinand Marcos called for a presidential election due to mounted political pressures. At first, UNIDO supported Senator Salvador Laurel of Batangas as its standard bearer, but business tycoon Chino Roces was not convinced that Laurel or Jovito Salonga could defeat Marcos in the polls. Roces argued that Corazon Aquino, the widow of assassinated Senator Aquino, should be the candidate for president. Roces initiated the Cory Aquino for President Movement (CAPM) to gather one million signatures in one week to urge Aquino to run as president, convincing Aquino to do so. Aquino was made the presidential bet of the Lakas ng Bayan party. However, Laurel did not give way to Aquino for the opposition's nomination as President until he was convinced by Cardinal Jaime Sin to run as her running-mate. Aquino had previously approached Laurel with a deal, wherein Aquino would give up her allegiance to the PDP–LABAN party and run as president under the UNIDO banner, with Laurel running for Vice President, effectively uniting the opposition groups against Marcos. Laurel had also previously offered Aquino the vice presidential nomination for UNIDO. In any case, Aquino ran for president under the UNIDO banner, with PDP–Laban endorsing UNIDO coalition.

The campaign was made in the month of January 1986, for the February election. Although she was officially reported to have lost the election to Marcos, the elections were widely believed to be fraudulent. Both Marcos and Aquino claimed to have won, and held rival inaugurations on February 25, but Marcos then fled in the face of huge popular demonstrations and the refusal of the military to intervene against them.

UNIDO was dissolved after the 1987 legislative and general elections, when new parties were formed and parties parted ways. Among the parties formed from UNIDO, the Laban ng Demokratikong Pilipino, became the dominant party of the Philippines until 1992.

1987 Philippine Legislative Elections 
The Lakas ng Bayan coalition for the elections was composed of PDP–Laban, Lakas ng Bansa, UNIDO, the Liberal Party-Salonga Wing, the National Union of Christian Democrats-United Muslim Democrats of the Philippines, the Philippine Democratic Socialist Party, BANDILA and Pinaghiusa.

1988 Crisis 
The PDP–Laban was split into the Pimentel and Cojuangco wings. The Lakas ng Bansa, headed by Ramon Mitra, and PDP–Laban's Cojuangco wing, joined forces to found a new party that would support President Cory Aquino's programs, the Laban ng Demokratikong Pilipino or LDP, thus shaking the anti-Aquino alliance into confusion.

2021 party revival 
After a long break of the party, on the year 2021, COMELEC accredited UNIDO as a political entity based in the Southern Tagalog region.

UNIDO formally reemerged as a regional political party on April 23, 2022, around two weeks before the May 9, 2022 polls. It was attended by Senator Francis Tolentino, senatorial aspirants Robin Padilla and Gilbert Teodoro, re-electionist Senator Joel Villanueva, as well as AGIMAT party-list representative and Bacoor Mayor Lani Mercado-Revilla. Also present was UNIDO President Jose Laurel IV, nephew of the party's founding chairman. 

At the said event hold in Manila Yacht Club, the party announced its support for 2022 presidential candidate Bongbong Marcos (son of former President Ferdinand Marcos, whom the party assisted in destabilizing his regime) and his running mate, Davao City Mayor Sara Duterte.

References 

Political parties established in 1980
Political parties disestablished in 1988
People Power Revolution
Regionalist parties
Regionalist parties in the Philippines